Maliszewski (feminine: Maliszewska; plural: Maliszewscy) is a surname of Polish-language origin. It is a toponymic surname associated with one of the places in Poland named Maliszew, Maliszewo, or Maliszów.   

the Lithuanianized version is  Mališauskas. The Russian-language versions of the surnames are Malishevsky (masculine), Malishevskaya (feminine).

Notable people with this surname include:

 Anna Maliszewska (born 1993), Polish modern pentathlete
 Natalia Maliszewska (born 1995), Polish short track speed skater
 Patrycja Maliszewska (born 1988), Polish short-track speed skater
 Łukasz Maliszewski (born 1985) Polish footballer
 Mirosław Maliszewski (born 1968), Polish politician
 Stas Maliszewski (born 1944), American football player
 Witold Maliszewski (1873–1939), Polish composer

 (1918-1977), Soviet film and stage actor

References

See also 
 
 

Polish-language surnames
Polish toponymic surnames